Blake Davis or Davies may refer to:

 Blake Davis (baseball) (born 1983), American baseball player
 Blake Davis (actor) (born 1991), Australian actor
Blake Davies, musician in Turbowolf and Captain Everything!